WTVZ-TV (channel 33) is a television station licensed to Norfolk, Virginia, United States, serving the Hampton Roads area as an affiliate of MyNetworkTV. Owned by Sinclair Broadcast Group, the station maintains studios on Clearfield Avenue in Virginia Beach, and its transmitter is located in Suffolk, Virginia.

History
In the late 1970s, the Hampton Roads area was unique in that it was one of the smallest media markets to have four commercial television stations: NBC affiliate WAVY-TV (channel 10), CBS station WTAR-TV (channel 3, now WTKR), ABC affiliate WVEC-TV (channel 13), and then-independent station WYAH-TV (channel 27, now CW affiliate WGNT)—the latter of which was owned by the then-Portsmouth-based Christian Broadcasting Network. WYAH-TV ran a fairly conservative program schedule–about three-quarters split between secular, general-entertainment fare (off-network reruns, movies, children's programming, etc.) and religious programming, such as CBN's own The 700 Club. Still, veteran Hampton Roads radio personality Gene Loving and television executive Tim McDonald felt that there was a need for a second independent station in that market, though a few markets far larger than Hampton Roads still didn't have independent stations (San Antonio, Texas and Birmingham, Alabama for example). In 1976, Loving and McDonald formed a group of investors under the Television Corporation of Virginia banner, and they secured a construction permit for Norfolk's vacant channel 33 two years later, in May 1978.

WTVZ began operations on September 24, 1979, as the area's fifth commercial station. The station ran a general entertainment format similar to WYAH but with a little less religious programming (for example, it ran the PTL Club between 10 a.m. and noon). WTVZ experienced early success, mostly through airing a moderate amount of programming that had been considered too objectionable for WYAH.  By 1981, WTVZ had passed WYAH in the ratings. Both stations had fairly similar shows (some of WTVZ's shows were ones that fell off WYAH shortly before), though WTVZ had stronger, better known, and more recent movies. Besides vintage movies, WTVZ aired a lot of cartoons, classic and recent off network sitcoms, and a few drama shows.

Television Corp. of Virginia would eventually change its corporate name to TVX Broadcast Group, and launched WRLH-TV (channel 35) in nearby Richmond in 1982. TVX also bought independent stations in Raleigh and Greensboro, North Carolina, New Orleans, and Little Rock, Arkansas and launched new independents in Nashville, Memphis, San Antonio and Buffalo, New York throughout the mid-1980s. In 1986, TVX's entire group, including WTVZ, became charter affiliates of the Fox Broadcasting Company.

In February 1987, TVX purchased Taft Broadcasting's Fox affiliates and independent stations, all of which were located in larger markets such as Philadelphia, Washington, D.C. and Miami. However, the company began to run into financial troubles due to debt incurred from the Taft purchase, and proceeded to sell its smaller-market stations one by one. In 1989, WTVZ was sold to Sullivan Broadcasting. The station was acquired by the Sinclair Broadcast Group in 1996. The Sinclair deal reunited channel 33 with several of its former TVX sister stations which had also been purchased by Sinclair.

WTVZ considered launching a local 10 p.m. newscast in 1991 and 1994, and in 2003 using Sinclair's News Central format. The station's plans to start a newscast have never come to fruition.

WTVZ kept its Fox affiliation until August 1998, when it became a WB affiliate as a result of a corporate deal between Sinclair and The WB. WVBT (channel 43), the market's original WB affiliate, signed an affiliation deal with Fox in November 1995, but was forced to wait until Fox's affiliation contract with WTVZ expired before joining the network. Throughout the 1990s, classic sitcoms, older movies, and older cartoons made way for more talk/reality shows, court shows, and more first run prime time shows from The WB. Like virtually every independent station (including UPN (before 2006), Fox, MyNetworkTV (after 2006), and WB/CW stations), the weekday cartoons also gradually disappeared from about 2000 to 2006, due to changes in the broadcast industry in general. The final Fox program to air on WTVZ was America's Most Wanted at 9:00 p.m. Eastern Time on August 1, 1998, while the first WB program aired was a repeat episode of The Parent 'Hood the next day at 7:00 p.m.

On January 24, 2006, CBS Corporation (which split from Viacom in December 2005) and Time Warner's Warner Bros. Entertainment (the division that operated The WB) announced that they would dissolve UPN and The WB, and move some of their programs to a newly created network operated as a joint venture between the companies, The CW Television Network, to launch on September 18, 2006. Former UPN affiliate WGNT became The CW's Hampton Roads affiliate. On March 2, 2006, Sinclair announced that WTVZ and sixteen of its sister stations would become MyNetworkTV affiliates, that affect in September. MyNetworkTV is operated by Fox and its parent company, the News Corporation. As a MyNetworkTV affiliate, the station changed its branding to "MyTVZ". This also made WTVZ one of the few stations to have been affiliated with both Fox and MyNetworkTV.

On May 15, 2012, Sinclair Broadcast Group and Fox agreed to a five-year affiliation agreement extension for Sinclair's 19 Fox-affiliated stations until 2017. This includes an option, exercisable between July 1, 2012 and March 31, 2013, for Fox parent News Corporation to buy a combination of six Sinclair-owned stations (two CW/MyNetworkTV duopolies and two standalone MyNetworkTV affiliates) in three out of four markets; WTVZ is included in the Fox purchase option, along with stations in Cincinnati (WSTR-TV), Raleigh (WLFL and WRDC) and Las Vegas (KVCW and KVMY). In January 2013, Fox has announced that it will not exercise its option to buy any of the Sinclair stations in those four markets mentioned.

On May 8, 2017, Sinclair Broadcast Group entered into an agreement to acquire Tribune Media—which has operated CBS affiliate WTKR and CW affiliate WGNT through a shared services agreement with their owner, Dreamcatcher Broadcasting, since 2013—for $3.9 billion, plus the assumption of $2.7 billion in debt held by Tribune, pending regulatory approval by the FCC and the U.S. Department of Justice's Antitrust Division. While WTKR is not in conflict with existing FCC in-market ownership rules and would have been acquired by Sinclair in any event, the group was precluded from acquiring WGNT directly as broadcasters are not currently allowed to legally own more than two full-power television stations in a single market (both WTVZ-TV and WGNT rank below the ratings threshold that forbids common ownership of two of the four highest-rated stations by total day viewership in a single market). a sale of either of the two lower-rated stations to an independent buyer was dependent on later decisions by the FCC regarding local ownership of broadcast television stations and future acts by Congress. Alternatively, Sinclair would have opted to either take over the operations of WTKR/WGNT or transfer ownership of and retain operational responsibilities for WTVZ-TV through a local marketing agreement with one of its partner companies.

Less than one month after the FCC voted to have the deal reviewed by an administrative law judge amid "serious concerns" about Sinclair's forthrightness in its applications to sell certain conflict properties, on August 9, 2018, Tribune announced it would terminate the Sinclair deal, intending to seek other M&A opportunities. Tribune also filed a breach of contract lawsuit in the Delaware Chancery Court, alleging that Sinclair engaged in protracted negotiations with the FCC and the DOJ over regulatory issues, refused to sell stations in markets where it already had properties, and proposed divestitures to parties with ties to Sinclair executive chair David D. Smith that were rejected or highly subject to rejection to maintain control over stations it was required to sell.

Technical information

Subchannels
The station's digital signal is multiplexed:

WTVZ-TV carried The Tube Music Network on digital subchannel 33.2 from July to December 2006. From 2010 until August 31, 2012, it carried TheCoolTV on 33.2 until Sinclair dropped the network on all of its stations. On July 2, 2014, WTVZ added GetTV on 33.2. On December 31, 2014, Grit replaced ZUUS Country on 33.3. In January, 2016 Comet was placed on 33.3, and Grit was subsequently moved to 33.4. On February 4, 2016, the American Sports Network diginet replaced GetTV (which moved to WAVY 10.3) on 33.2.

Analog-to-digital conversion
WTVZ-TV discontinued regular programming on its analog signal, over UHF channel 33, on February 17, 2009, to conclude the federally mandated transition from analog to digital television. In late April 2009, the station's digital signal relocated from its pre-transition UHF channel 38 to channel 33.

References

External links
WTVZ website

MyNetworkTV affiliates
Charge! (TV network) affiliates
Comet (TV network) affiliates
TBD (TV network) affiliates
Sinclair Broadcast Group
Television channels and stations established in 1979
TVZ
1979 establishments in Virginia
Norfolk, Virginia